The decolonization of the Americas occurred over several centuries as most of the countries in the Americas gained their independence from European rule. The American Revolution was the first in the Americas, and the British defeat in the American Revolutionary War (1775–1783) was a victory against a great power, aided by France and Spain, Britain's enemies. The French Revolution in Europe followed, and collectively these events had profound effects on the Spanish, Portuguese, and French colonies in the Americas. A revolutionary wave followed, resulting in the creation of several independent countries in Latin America. The Haitian Revolution lasted from 1791 to 1804 and resulted in the independence of the French slave colony. The Peninsular War with France, which resulted from the Napoleonic occupation of Spain, caused Spanish Creoles in Spanish America to question their allegiance to Spain, stoking independence movements that culminated in various Spanish American wars of independence (1808–33), which were primarily fought between opposing groups of colonists and only secondarily against Spanish forces. At the same time, the Portuguese monarchy fled to Brazil during the French invasion of Portugal. After the royal court returned to Lisbon, the prince regent, Pedro, remained in Brazil and in 1822 successfully declared himself emperor of a newly independent Brazilian Empire.

Spain would lose all three of its remaining Caribbean colonies by the end of the 1800s. Santo Domingo declared independence in 1821 as the Republic of Spanish Haiti. After unification and then split from the former French colony of Haiti, the President of the Dominican Republic signed an agreement that reverted the country to a Spanish colony in 1861. This triggered the Dominican Restoration War, which resulted in the Dominican Republic's second independence from Spain in 1865. Cuba fought for independence from Spain in the Ten Years' War (1868–78) and Little War (1879-80) and finally the Cuban War of Independence (1895–98). American intervention in 1898 became the Spanish–American War and resulted in the United States gaining Puerto Rico, Guam (which are still U.S. territories), and the Philippine Islands in the Pacific Ocean. Under military occupation, Cuba became a U.S. protectorate until its independence in 1902.

Peaceful independence by the voluntary withdrawal of colonial powers then became the norm in the second half of the 20th century. However, there are still many British and Dutch colonies in North America (mostly Caribbean islands), and France has fully integrated most of its former colonies in the Americas (French Guiana, Guadeloupe, and Martinique) as fully constituent departments.

Conditions before revolution

Undermining of metropolitan authority

During the 18th century, Spain recovered much of the strength it had lost in the 17th century but the country's resources were under strain because of the incessant warfare in Europe from 1793. This led to increased local participation in the financing of defense and increased participation in militias by the locally born. Such development was at odds with the ideals of the centralized absolute monarchy. The Spanish also made formal concessions to strengthen defense; In Chiloé, Spanish authorities promised freedom from the Encomienda for indigenous locals who settled near the new stronghold of Ancud (founded in 1768) and contributed to its defense. The increased local organization of the defenses would ultimately undermine the metropolitan authority and bolster the independence movement.

Napoleonic Wars

The Napoleonic Wars were a series of wars fought between France (led by Napoleon Bonaparte) and alliances involving Britain, Prussia, Spain, Portugal, Russia, and Austria at different times, from 1799 to 1815.

In the case of Spain and its colonies, in May 1808, Napoleon captured Carlos IV and King Fernando VII and installed his brother, Joseph Bonaparte, as Spanish monarch because he did not want anyone outside of his bloodline to rule Spain. This event disrupted the political stability of Spain and broke the link with some of the colonies which were loyal to the Bourbon Dynasty. The local elites, the creoles, took matters into their own hands organizing themselves into juntas to take "in absence of the king, Fernando VII, their sovereignty devolved temporarily back to the community". The juntas swore loyalty to the captive Fernando VII and each ruled different and diverse parts of the colony. Most of Fernando's subjects were loyal to him in 1808, but after he was restored to the Spanish crown in 1814, his policy of restoring absolute power alienated both the juntas and his subjects. He abrogated the Cádiz Constitution of 1812 and punished those who had supported it. The violence used by royalist forces and the prospect of being ruled by Fernando shifted the majority of the colonist population in favor of separation from Spain. The local elites reacted to absolutism in much the same way that the British colonial elites, Tory and Whig alike, had reacted to London's interference before 1775.

Spanish military presence in its colonies

The colonial army of the Spanish Empire in the Americas was made up of local American and European supporters of King Ferdinand. The Royalists were made up of a cross-section of society loyal to the crown with Americans composing the majority of the royalist forces on all fronts. There were two types of military units: from the regular Spanish army which were sent out or formed with local Europeans and called Expidicionarios and units called veterans or militias created in the Americas. The militias included some veteran units and were called the disciplined militia. Only 11% of the personnel in the militias were European or American whites. After Rafael del Riego's revolution in 1820, no more Spanish soldiers were sent to the wars in the Americas. In 1820 there were only 10,000 soldiers in Royal Army in Colombia and Venezuela, and Spaniards formed only 10% of all the royalist armies, and only half of the soldiers of the expeditionary units were European. By the Battle of Ayacucho in 1824, less than 1% of the soldiers were European.

Other factors

The Enlightenment spurred the desire for social and economic reform to spread throughout the Americas and the Iberian Peninsula. Ideas about free trade and physiocratic economics were raised by the Enlightenment.

Independence movements in South America can be traced back to slave revolts in plantations in the northernmost part of the continent and the Caribbean. In 1791, a massive slave revolt sparked a general insurrection against the plantation system and French colonial power. These events were followed by a violent uprising led by José Leonardo Chirino and José Caridad González that sprung up in 1795 Venezuela, allegedly inspired by the revolution in Haiti.

Toussaint L'Ouverture was born a slave in Saint-Domingue where he developed labor skills that would give him higher privileges than other slaves. He intellectually and physically advanced resulting in promotion, land of his own, and owning slaves. In 1791, slaves in Haiti formed a revolution to seek independence from their French owners. L'Ouverture joined the rebellion as a top military official to abolish slavery without complete independence. However, through a series of letters written by Toussaint, it became clear that he grew open to equal human rights for all that live in Haiti. Similar to how the United States Constitution was ratified, the enlightenment ideas of equality and representation of the people created an impact of change against the status quo that sparked the revolution. The letter details the great concerns he felt due to a conservative shift in France's legislature after the revolution in 1797. The greatest fear was that these conservative values could give ideas to the French Government to bring back slavery. The enlightenment has proven to forever change the way a captive society thinks after L'Ouverture refuses to let the French send him and his people back into slavery. "[W]hen finally the rule of law took the place of anarchy under which the unfortunate colony had too long suffered, what fatality can have led the greatest enemy of its prosperity and our happiness still to dare to threaten us with the return of slavery?" Ultimately, slavery was abolished from French colonies in 1794 and Haiti declared Independence from France in 1804.

United States

The United States of America declared independence from Great Britain on July 4, 1776, thus becoming the first independent, foreign-recognized nation in the Americas and the first European colonial entity to break from its mother country. Britain formally acknowledged American independence in 1783 after its defeat in the American Revolutionary War. The U.S. victory encouraged independent movements in other parts of the Americas.

Although initially occupying only the land east of the Mississippi between Canada and Florida, the United States would later eventually acquire various other North American territories from the British, French, Spanish, and Russians in succeeding years under the mantle of Manifest Destiny. While ending European control over the region, these events resulted in the expansion of settler colonialism against Native nations, especially following the discovery of gold in regions such as the Dakotas and California, as well as opportunities for American settlers to claim farmland in the Great Plains.

Haiti and the French Antilles

The American and French Revolutions had profound effects on the Spanish, Portuguese and French colonies in the Americas. Haiti, a French slave colony, was the first to follow the United States to independence, during the Haitian Revolution, which lasted from 1791 to 1804. Thwarted in his attempt to rebuild a French empire in North America, Napoleon Bonaparte sold Louisiana to the United States and from then on focused on the European theater, marking the end of France's ambitions of building a colonial empire in the Western Hemisphere.

Spanish America 

Except for Cuba and Puerto Rico, the Spanish colonies in the Americas won their independence during the first quarter of the 19th century.

During the Peninsular War, Napoleon installed his brother, Joseph Bonaparte, on the Spanish throne and captured the King Fernando VII. The crisis of political legitimacy sparked a reaction in Spain's overseas empire. Several assemblies were established after 1810 by the Criollos (Latin Americans who are of full or near full Spanish descent) to recover sovereignty and self-government based on the Castilian law and to rule American lands in the name of Ferdinand VII of Spain.

This experience of self-government, along with the influence of Liberalism and the ideas of the French and American Revolutions, brought about a struggle for independence, led by the Libertadores. The territories freed themselves, often with help from foreign mercenaries and privateers. The United States and Europe were neutral, yet aimed to achieve political influence and trade without the Spanish monopoly.

In South America, Simón Bolívar and José de San Martín led the final phase of the independence struggle. Although Bolívar attempted to keep the Spanish-speaking parts of the continent politically unified, they rapidly became independent of one another as well, and several further wars were fought, such as the Paraguayan War and the War of the Pacific.

A related process took place in what is now Mexico, Central America, and parts of North America between 1810 and 1821 with the Mexican War of Independence. Independence was achieved in 1821 by a coalition uniting under Agustín de Iturbide and the Army of the Three Guarantees. Unity was maintained for a short period under the First Mexican Empire, but within a decade the region fought against the United States over the borderlands (losing the bordering lands of California and Texas). Most of the heat was during the official Mexican-American War from 1846 to 1848.

In 1898, in the Greater Antilles, the United States won the Spanish–American War and occupied Cuba and Puerto Rico, ending Spanish territorial control in the Americas.

Argentina

After the defeat of Spain in the Peninsular War and the abdication King Ferdinand VII, the Spanish colonial government of the Viceroyalty of the Río de la Plata, present-day Argentina, majority of Bolivia, parts of Chile, Paraguay and Uruguay, became greatly weakened. Without a rightful king on the Spanish throne to render the office of the Viceroy legitimate, the right of Viceroy Baltasar Hidalgo de Cisneros to govern came under fire. The local elites, tired of the Spanish trade restrictions and taxes, seized the opportunity and during the May Revolution of 1810, removed Cisneros and created the first local government, the Primera Junta.

Following half a decade of battles and skirmishes with provincial royalist forces within the former Vice-royalty along with military expeditions across the Andes to Chile, Peru and Bolivia led by General José de San Martín to finally end Spanish rule in America, a formal declaration was signed on July 9, 1816, by an assembly in San Miguel de Tucumán, declaring full independence with provisions for a national constitution. The Argentine Constitution was signed in 1853, declaring the creation of the Argentine Republic.

Bolivia

Following upheaval caused by the May Revolution, along with the independence movements in Chile and Venezuela, a local struggle for independence kicked off with two failed revolutions. Over sixteen years of struggle followed before the first steps toward the establishment of a republic were taken.

Formally, it is considered that the fight for independence culminated in the Battle of Ayacucho, on December 9, 1824.

Colombia

Chile

The Chilean Independence campaign was led by Liberator General Jose de San Martin with the support of Chilean exiles such as Bernardo O'Higgins. The local independence movement was composed of Chilean-born criollos, who sought political and economic independence from Spain. The independence movement was far from gaining unanimous support among Chileans, who became divided between independentists and royalists. What started as an elitist political movement against their colonial master, finally ended as a full-fledged civil war. Traditionally, the process is divided into three stages: Patria Vieja, Reconquista, and Patria Nueva.

Ecuador

The first uprising against Spanish rule took place in 1809, and criollos in Ecuador set up a junta on September 22, 1810, to rule in the name of the Bourbon monarch; but as elsewhere, it allowed assertion of their power. Only in 1822 did Ecuador fully gain independence and became part of Gran Colombia, from which it withdrew in 1830. At the Battle of Pichincha, near present-day Quito, Ecuador on May 24, 1822, General Antonio José de Sucre's forces defeated a Spanish force defending Quito. The Spanish defeat guaranteed the liberation of Ecuador.

Guatemala
When Mexico achieved its independence in 1821 with the Treaty of Córdoba, the Captaincy General of Guatemala that had ruled Central America became politically independent as well, without the necessity of violent struggle. Guatemala declared its independence on September 15, 1821, likely to prevent the Mexican Army of the Three Guarantees from "liberating" Guatemala and overriding nascent local autonomy. However, Guatemala chose to be annexed to the First Mexican Empire, led by royalist-turned-insurgent military leader Agustín de Iturbide, who was proclaimed emperor of Mexico in 1822. When Iturbide abdicated from the monarchy and Mexico took steps to be a republic, Central America claimed its independence on 1 July 1823.

Mexico

Independence in Mexico was a protracted struggle from 1808 until the fall of the royal government in 1821 and the establishment of independent Mexico. In the Viceroyalty of New Spain, as elsewhere in Spanish America in 1808, reacted to the unexpected French invasion of the Iberian peninsula and the ouster of the Bourbon king, replaced by Joseph Bonaparte. Local American-born Spaniards saw the opportunity to seize control from Viceroy José de Iturrigaray who may well have been sympathetic to creole's aspirations. Iturrigaray was ousted by pro-royalists. A few from among the creole elites sought independence, including Juan Aldama, Ignacio Allende, and the secular parish priest Miguel Hidalgo y Costilla. Hidalgo made a proclamation in his home parish of Dolores, which was not recorded in writing at the time, but denounced the bad government and gachupines (pejorative for peninsular-born Spaniards), and declared independence. The unorganized hordes following Hidalgo wrought destruction on the property and the lives of whites in the region of the Bajío. Hidalgo was caught, defrocked, and executed in 1811, along with Allende. Their heads remained on display until 1821. His former student José María Morelos continued the rebellion and was himself caught and killed in 1815. The struggle of Mexican insurgents continued under the leadership of Vicente Guerrero and Guadalupe Victoria. From 1815 to 1820 there was a stalemate in New Spain, with royalist forces unable to defeat the insurgents and the insurgents unable to expand beyond their narrow territory in the southern region. Again, events in Spain intervened, with an uprising of military men against Ferdinand VII and the restoration of the liberal Spanish Constitution of 1812, which mandated a constitutional monarchy and curtailed the power of the Roman Catholic Church. The monarch repudiated the constitution once the Spanish monarchy was restored in 1814. For conservatives in New Spain, these changed political circumstances threatened the institutions of church and state. Royal military officer Agustín de Iturbide seized the opportunity to lead, allying with his former enemy Guerrero. Iturbide proclaimed the Plan de Iguala, which called for independence, equality of peninsular and American-born Spaniards, and a monarchy with a prince from Spain as king. He persuaded the insurgent Guerrero to ally with him and create the Army of the Three Guarantees. Crown rule in New Spain collapsed when the incoming Viceroy Juan O'Donojú signed the Treaty of Córdoba recognizing Mexico's sovereignty. With no European monarch presenting himself for the crown of Mexico, Iturbide himself was proclaimed emperor Agustín I in 1822. He was overthrown in 1823 and Mexico was established as a republic. Decades of political and economic instability ensued which resulted in a population decline.

Paraguay
Paraguay gained its independence on the night of May 14 and the morning of May 15, 1811, after a plan organized by various pro-independence nationalists including Fulgencio Yegros and José Gaspar Rodríguez de Francia.

Peru

Spain initially had the support of the Lima oligarchs because of their opposition to the commercial interests of Buenos Aires and Chile. Therefore, the Viceroyalty of Peru became the last redoubt of the Spanish Monarchy in South America. Nevertheless, a Creole rebellion arose in 1812 in Huánuco and another in Cusco between 1814 and 1816. Both were suppressed. These rebellions were supported by the armies of Buenos Aires.

Peru finally succumbed after the decisive continental campaigns of José de San Martín (1820–1823) and Simón Bolívar (1824). While San Martin was in charge of the land campaign, a newly built Chilean Navy led by Lord Cochrane transported the fighting troops and launched a sea campaign against the Spanish fleet in the Pacific. San Martín, who had displaced the royalists of Chile after the Battle of Maipú, and who had disembarked in Paracas in 1820, proclaimed the independence of Peru in Lima on July 28, 1821. Four years later, the Spanish Monarchy was defeated definitively at the Battle of Ayacucho in late 1824.

After independence, the conflicts of interests that faced different sectors of Creole Peruvian society and the particular ambitions of the caudillos, made the organization of the country excessively difficult. Only three civilians—Manuel Pardo, Nicolás de Piérola, and Francisco García Calderón—acceded to the presidency in the first seventy-five years of Peru's independence. The Republic of Bolivia was created in Upper Peru. In 1837 a Peru-Bolivian Confederation was also created but was dissolved two years later due to Chilean military intervention.

Uruguay
Following the events of the May Revolution, in 1811 José Gervasio Artigas, led a successful revolt against the Spanish forces in the Provincia Oriental, now Uruguay, joining the independentist movement that was taking place in the Viceroyalty of the Río de la Plata at the time. In 1821, the Provincia Oriental was invaded by Portugal, trying to annex it into Brazil under the name of Província Cisplatina.

The former Vice-royalty of the Río de la Plata, United Provinces of the Río de la Plata, fought back against Brazil in a war that lasted over 2 years, eventually turning into a stalemate. The Brazilian forces withdrew with the United Provinces keeping them at bay but failing to win any decisive victory. With neither side gaining the upper hand and the economic burden of the war crippling the United Provinces economy, the Treaty of Montevideo was signed in 1828, fostered by Britain, declaring Uruguay as an independent state.

Venezuela

According to the Encyclopedia Americana of 1865, General Francisco de Miranda, already a hero to the French, Prussians, English, and Americans had garnered a series of successes against the Spanish between 1808 and 1812. He had effectively negated their access to all the ports in the Caribbean, thus preventing them from receiving reinforcements and supplies, and was essentially conducting mopping-up operations throughout the country. At that point, he convinced Simon Bolívar to join the struggle and put him in charge of the fort at Puerto Cabello. This was all at once a supply and arms depot, a strategic port, and the central holding facility for Spanish prisoners. Through what amounts to a gross dereliction of duty, Simon Bolívar neglected to enforce the customary security dispositions before departing to a social event. During the night there was an uprising of the Spanish prisoners and they managed to subdue the Independentist garrison and gain control of the supplies, arms and ammunition, and the port. The Loyalist forces progressively regained control of the country and eventually, Monteverde's successes forced the newly formed congress of the republic to ask Miranda that he sign a capitulation at La Victoria in Aragua, on July 12, 1812, thus ending the first phase of the revolutionary war.

After the capitulation of 1812, Simón Bolívar turned over Francisco de Miranda to the Spanish authorities, secured a safe passage for himself and his closest officers, and fled to New Granada. He later returned with a new army, while the war had entered a tremendously violent phase. After much of the local aristocracy had abandoned the cause of independence, blacks and mulattoes carried on the struggle. Elites reacted with open distrust and opposition to the efforts of these common people. Bolívar's forces invaded Venezuela from New Granada in 1813, waging a campaign with a ferocity captured perfectly by their motto of "war to the death". Bolívar's forces defeated Domingo Monteverde's Spanish army in a series of battles, taking Caracas on August 6, 1813, and besieging Monteverde at Puerto Cabello in September 1813.

With loyalists displaying the same passion and violence, the rebels achieved only short-lived victories. The army led by the loyalist José Tomás Boves demonstrated the key military role that the Llaneros came to play in the region's struggle. Turning the tide against independence, these highly mobile, ferocious fighters made up a formidable military force that pushed Bolívar out of his home country once more. In 1814, heavily reinforced Spanish forces in Venezuela lost a series of battles to Bolívar's forces but then decisively defeated Bolivar at La Puerta on June 15, took Caracas on July 16, and again defeated his army at Aragua on August 18, for 2,000 Spanish casualties out of 10,000 soldiers as well as most of the 3,000 in the rebel army. Bolívar and other leaders then returned to New Granada. Later that year the largest expeditionary force ever sent by Spain to America arrived under the command of Pablo Morillo. This force effectively replaced the improvised llanero units, who were disbanded by Morillo.

Bolívar and other republican leaders returned to Venezuela in December 1816, leading a largely unsuccessful insurrection against Spain from 1816 to 1818 from bases in the Llanos and Ciudad Bolívar in the Orinoco River area.

In 1819 Bolívar successfully invaded New Granada, and returned to Venezuela in April 1821, leading a large army of 7,000. At Carabobo on June 24, his forces decisively defeated Spanish and colonial forces, winning Venezuelan independence, although hostilities continued.

Brazil

Unlike the Spanish, the Portuguese did not divide their colonial territory in the Americas. The captaincies they created were subdued to a centralized administration in Salvador which reported directly to the Crown in Lisbon. Therefore, it is not common to refer to "Portuguese America" (like Spanish America, Dutch America, etc.), but rather to Brazil, as a unified colony since its very beginnings.

As a result, Brazil did not split into several states by the time of independence (1822), as happened to its Spanish-speaking neighbors. The adoption of a monarchy instead of a federal republic in the first six decades of Brazilian political sovereignty also contributed to the nation's unity. 

After several failed revolts, in the Portuguese colony Dom Pedro I (also Pedro IV of Portugal), son of the Portuguese king Dom João VI, proclaimed the country's independence in 1822 and became Brazil's first Emperor. This began when Napoleon Bonaparte forced the Portuguese court out of their capital city of Lisbon and into exile in Brazil. Over the next eight years, the capital of the Portuguese empire would be located in Rio de Janeiro. In 1815, after Lisbon was reclaimed from the French by the Portuguese, King Dom João VI declared that Rio and Lisbon would become equal centers of the empire. King João VI was forced back to Lisbon in 1821 by the Portuguese Cortes but left his son Dom Pedro behind to run Rio. A year later, Dom Pedro declared independence for Brazil and officially became emperor Pedro I. Although Brazil's independence was met with little resistance from Portugal, several snall-scale battles were fought against Portuguese loyalist forces until 1824 to bring the rest of the Brazilian territories under the control of the new Brazilian government, and they were officially recognized by their former colonial overlords in 1825.

Canada

Canada's transition from colonial rule to independence occurred gradually over many decades and was achieved mostly through political means, as opposed to the violent revolutions that marked the end of colonialism in other North and South American countries. Attempts at revolting against the British, such as the Rebellions of 1837–1838, were brief and quickly put down. Canada was declared a dominion within the British Empire in 1867. Originally, the Canadian Confederation included just a few of what are now Canada's eastern provinces; other British colonies in modern-day Canada, such as British Columbia, Prince Edward Island, and Newfoundland, would join later (the last only in 1949). Additionally, Britain's and Norway's claims to Arctic lands were ceded to Canada in the late 19th and early 20th centuries. By 1931, the United Kingdom had relinquished its control over Canada's foreign policy. What few political links that remained between Canada and the UK were formally severed in 1982 with the Canada Act.

20th century
Other countries did not gain independence until the 20th century:

From Spain:
 Cuba

From the United Kingdom:
 Jamaica: from the United Kingdom, in 1962
 Trinidad and Tobago: from the United Kingdom, in 1962
 Guyana: from the United Kingdom, in 1966.
 Barbados: from the United Kingdom, in 1966
 Bahamas: Granted internal self-government in 1964 and, then achieved full independence from the United Kingdom in 1973.
 Grenada: from the United Kingdom, in 1974
 Dominica: from the United Kingdom, in 1978
 Saint Lucia: from the United Kingdom, in 1979
 St. Vincent and the Grenadines: from the United Kingdom, in 1979
 Antigua and Barbuda: from the United Kingdom, in 1981
 Belize (formerly British Honduras): from the United Kingdom, in 1981
 Saint Kitts and Nevis: from the United Kingdom, in 1983

From the Netherlands:
 Suriname: from the Netherlands, in 1975

Current non-sovereign territories
Some parts of the Americas are still administered by European countries or the United States:
 Anguilla (United Kingdom)
 Aruba (Netherlands)
 Bermuda (United Kingdom)
 Bonaire (Netherlands)
 British Virgin Islands (United Kingdom)
 Cayman Islands (United Kingdom)
 Curacao (Netherlands)
 Falkland Islands (United Kingdom)
 French Guiana (France)
 Greenland (Kingdom of Denmark)
 Guadeloupe (France)
 Martinique (France)
 Montserrat (United Kingdom)
 Puerto Rico (United States)
 Saba (Netherlands)
 Saint Barthelemy (France)
 Saint Martin (France)
 Saint-Pierre and Miquelon (France)
 Sint Eustatius (Netherlands)
 Sint Maarten (Netherlands)
 South Georgia and South Sandwich Islands (United Kingdom)
 Turks and Caicos Islands (United Kingdom)
 United States Virgin Islands (United States)

Some of the remaining non-sovereign territories of the Americas have retained this status by choice, and enjoy a significant degree of self-government. (Some have nevertheless been placed on the U.N. list of non-self-governing territories, an ongoing subject of controversy.) Aruba, for example, seceded from the Netherlands Antilles on January 1, 1986, and became a separate, self-governing member of the Kingdom of the Netherlands. A movement toward full independence by 1996 was halted at Aruba's request in 1990. French Guiana, Guadeloupe and Martinique are not considered dependent territories of France, but have been "incorporated" into France itself, as overseas départements (départements d'outre-mer, or DOM). Other regions however have had or currently have movements to change their political status, for example, different movements to change the political status of Puerto Rico and intermittent calls for independence in other non-sovereign territories such as Martinique and others, with differing amounts of support.

Timeline

North America
This is a list of all present sovereign states in North America and their predecessors. The division between North and South America is unclear, generally viewed as lying somewhere in the Isthmus of Panama, however, the Caribbean Islands, Central America including the whole of Panama is considered to be part of North America as its southernmost nation. The continent was colonized by the Europeans: Mainly by the Spaniards, the French, the English and the Dutch. The United States of America gained its independence in American Revolutionary War; most of nations in Central America gained independence in the early 19th century; Canada and many other island countries in the Caribbean Sea (most of them were British colonies) gained their independence in 20th century. Today, North America consists of twenty-two sovereign states with common government system being some form of presidential republic.

South America
This is a list of all present sovereign states in South America and their predecessors. The division between North and South America is unclear, generally viewed as lying somewhere in the Isthmus of Panama, however, the whole of Panama is considered to be part of North America as its southernmost nation. The continent was colonized by the Europeans: First by the Spaniards, and the Portuguese; and later by the Dutch, the French, and the English. Most of the present-day nations gained independence in the early 19th century. Today, South America consists of twelve sovereign states with common government system being some form of presidential republic.

{| class="wikitable"
|-
! Sovereign state
! Predecessors
|-
| Argentina
|  Viceroyalty of Peru (1542–1776) (Viceroyalty of the Crown of Castile) Viceroyalty of the Río de la Plata (1776–1810) (Viceroyalty of the Spanish Empire) United Provinces of the Río de la Plata (1810–1831) Argentine Confederation (1831–1861) (1861–present)
|-
| Bolivia
|   Governorate of New Toledo (1528–1542) Viceroyalty of Peru (1542–1776) (Viceroyalty of the Crown of Castile) Viceroyalty of the Río de la Plata (1776–1810) (Viceroyalty of the Spanish Empire) Viceroyalty of Peru (1810–1825) (Viceroyalty of the Spanish Empire) (1825–2009) (2009–present)
|-
| Brazil
|  Colonial Brazil (1500-1815) (colony of Portugal) United Kingdom of Portugal, Brazil and the Algarves (1815–1822) Empire of Brazil (1822–1889) Republic of the United States of Brazil (1889–1930) Republic of the United States of Brazil (1930–1946) (renamed "United States of Brazil" in 1937) United States of Brazil (1946–1964) United States of Brazil (1964–1989) (military dictatorship, renamed "Federative Republic of Brazil" in 1967) (1889–present)
|-
| Chile
|  Captaincy General of Chile (1542–1818) (1818–present)
|-
| Colombia
|  Viceroyalty of Peru (1542–1717) Viceroyalty of New Granada (1717–1819) Gran Colombia (1819–1831) Republic of New Granada (1831–1858) Granadine Confederation (1858–1863) United States of Colombia (1863–1886) (1886–present)
|-
| Ecuador
|  Viceroyalty of Peru (1542–1717) Viceroyalty of New Granada (1717–1822) Gran Colombia (1822–1830) (1830–present)
|-
| Guyana
|  Colony of Essequibo (1616–1815),  Berbice (1627–1815) &  Colony of Demerara (1745–1815) (all Dutch colonies) British Guiana (1814–1966) Commonwealth Realm of Guyana (1966–1970) (1970–present)
|-
| Panama
|  Viceroyalty of Peru (1542–1717) Viceroyalty of New Granada (1717–1819) Gran Colombia (1819–1831) Republic of New Granada (1831–1858) Granadine Confederation (1858–1863) United States of Colombia (1863–1906) (1906–present)
|-
| Paraguay
|  Viceroyalty of the Río de la Plata (1776–1814) (1814–present)
|-
| Peru
|  Inca Empire (1438–1533) Governorate of New Castile (1528–1542) &  Governorate of New Toledo (1528–1542) (both Spanish colonies) Viceroyalty of Peru (1542–1824) (1824–present)
|-
| Suriname
|  Colony of Surinam (1630–1954) Country of Suriname (1954–1975) (constituent country of the Kingdom of the Netherlands) (1975–present)
|-
| Trinidad and Tobago
|  Viceroyalty of New Granada (1717–1797) British West Indies (1797–1962) (1962–present)
|-
| Uruguay
|   United Provinces of the Río de la Plata (1810–1816) United Kingdom of Portugal, Brazil and the Algarves (1816–1822) Empire of Brazil (1822–1828) (1828–present)
|-
| Venezuela
|  Viceroyalty of New Granada (1717–1819) Gran Colombia (1819–1828)''' (1828–present) (renamed from "Republic of Venezuela" in 1999)|}

World reaction

United States and Great Britain
Great Britain and the United States were rivals for influence in the newly independent sovereign nations. As a result of the successful revolutions which established so many newly independent nations, United States President James Monroe and the Secretary of State John Quincy Adams drafted the Monroe Doctrine. It stated that the United States would not tolerate any European interference in the Western Hemisphere. This measure ostensibly was taken to safeguard the newfound liberties of these new countries, but it was also taken as a precautionary measure against the intrusion of European states. Since the United States was a newly founded nation, it could not prevent other European powers from interfering, for that the United States looked for Britain's help and support to execute the Monroe Doctrine into action.

Great Britain's trade with Latin America greatly expanded during the revolutionary period, which until then was restricted due to Spanish mercantilist trade policies. British pressure was sufficient to prevent Spain from attempting any serious reassertion of its control over its lost colonies.

Attempts at hemispheric unity

The notion of closer Spanish American cooperation and unity was first put forward by the Liberator Simón Bolívar who, in 1826 Congress of Panama, proposed the creation of a league of American republics, with a common military, a mutual defense pact, and a supranational parliamentary assembly. This meeting was attended by representatives of Gran Colombia (comprising the modern-day nations of Colombia, Ecuador, Panama, and Venezuela), Peru, the United Provinces of Central America (Guatemala, El Salvador, Honduras, Nicaragua, and Costa Rica), and Mexico. Nevertheless, the great distances and geographical barriers, not to mention the different national and regional interests, made union impossible.

Sixty-three years later the Commercial Bureau of the American Republics was established. It was renamed the International Commercial Bureau at the Second International Conference of 1901–1902. These two bodies, in existence as of 14 April 1890, represent the point of inception of today's Organization of American States.

See also
 Colonialism
 Decolonization
 Wars of national liberation
 Predecessors of sovereign states in South America
 Creole nationalism
 Spanish Empire
 Libertadores
 Spanish reconquest of Mexico
 Spanish American Royalists
 Wars of national liberation
 History of Central America
 History of South America
 History of Cuba
 History of the Dominican Republic
 History of Puerto Rico
 Age of Revolution
 Territorial evolution of the Caribbean
Notes

References

Further reading
 Andrien, Kenneth J. and Lyman, L. Johnson. The Political Economy of Spanish America in the Age of Revolution, 1750–1850. Albuquerque, University of New Mexico Press, 1994. 
 Bethell, Leslie. From Independence to 1870. The Cambridge History of Latin America, Vol. 3. Cambridge University Press, 1987. 
 Burns, Bradford E. The Poverty of Progress: Latin America in the Nineteenth Century. Berkeley, University of California Press, 1980. 
 Brown, Matthew. Adventuring through Spanish Colonies: Simón Bolívar, Foreign Mercenaries and the Birth of New Nations. Liverpool University Press, 2006. 
 Bushnell, David, and Macaulay, Neill. The Emergence of Latin America in the Nineteenth Century (2nd edition). Oxford University Press, 1994. 
 Chasteen, John Charles. Americanos: Latin America's Struggle for Independence. Oxford University Press, 2008. 
 Costeloe, Michael P. . Response to Revolution: Imperial Spain and the Spanish American Revolutions, 1810–1840. Cambridge University Press, 1986. 
 Graham, Richard. Independence in Latin America: A Comparative Approach (2nd edition). McGraw-Hill, 1994. 
 Harvey, Robert. "Liberators: Latin America`s Struggle For Independence, 1810–1830". John Murray, London (2000). 
 Hasbrouck, Alfred. Foreign Legionaries in the Liberation of Spanish South America. New York: Octagon Books, 1969.
 Higgins, James (editor). The Emancipation of Peru: British Eyewitness Accounts, 2014. Online at https://sites.google.com/site/jhemanperu
 Humphreys, R. A., and Lynch, John (editors). The Origins of the Latin American Revolutions, 1808–1826. New York, Alfred A. Knopf, 1965.
 Kaufman, William W.. British Policy and the Independence of Latin America, 1804–1828. New Haven, Yale University Press, 1951.
 Kinsbruner, Jay. Independence in Spanish America. 1994
 Lynch, John. The Spanish American Revolutions, 1808-1826, 2nd ed.. 1986
 Robertson, William Spence. France and Latin American Independence. New York, Octagon, [1939] 1967.
 Savelle, Max. Empires to Nations: Expansion in America, 1713–1824. Europe and the World in the Age of Expansion, Vol. 5. Minneapolis, University of Minnesota Press, 1974. 
 Uribe, Victor M. "The Enigma of Latin American Independence: Analyses of the Last Ten Years," Latin American Research Review (1997) 32#1 pp. 236–255 in JSTOR
 Whitaker, Arthur P. The United States and the Independence of Latin America, 1800–1830. Baltimore, Johns Hopkins University Press, 1941.
 Zea, Leopoldo. The Latin-American Mind''. Norman, University of Oklahoma Press, 1963.

European colonization of the Americas
Independence movements
Decolonization
History of the Americas
Rebellions against the Spanish Empire
Rebellions against the British Empire
Decolonization by region
Spanish colonization of the Americas